Private Potter is a 1962 British drama film directed by Caspar Wrede and starring Tom Courtenay, Mogens Wieth, Ronald Fraser and James Maxwell.

Plot
During the Cyprus Emergency (1955-1959), the eponymous Private Potter is a soldier who claims that the reason he cried out leading to the death of a comrade was that he saw a vision of God. There is then a debate over whether he should be court-martialled.

Cast
 Tom Courtenay as Private Potter 
 Mogens Wieth as Yannis 
 Ronald Fraser as Doctor 
 James Maxwell as Lieutenant Colonel Harry Gunyon 
 Ralph Michael as Padre 
 Brewster Mason as Brigadier 
 Eric Thompson as Captain John Knowles 
 John Graham as Major Sims 
 Frank Finlay as Captain Patterson 
 Harry Landis as Lance Corporal Lamb 
 Michael Coles as Private Robertson 
 Jeremy Geidt as Major Reid 
 Fulton Mackay as Soldier

Production
The screenplay was written by Ronald Harwood for a television play that was broadcast on ITV in 1961 featuring some of the same main cast, including Tom Courtenay, and Caspar Wrede again as director. Finnish-born director Wrede first spotted Courtenay while he was still at RADA and the leading role of the fragile young soldier who wilts under pressure was his first film appearance.

References

External links 

1962 films
British drama films
1962 drama films
Metro-Goldwyn-Mayer films
Films set in Cyprus
Films set in the 1950s
Cyprus Emergency
Films with screenplays by Ronald Harwood
Films shot at MGM-British Studios
1960s English-language films
Films based on television plays
1960s British films